Montville is a township in Morris County, in the U.S. state of New Jersey. As of the 2020 United States census, the township's population was 22,450, an increase of 922 (+4.3%) from the 2010 census count of 21,528, which in turn reflected an increase of 689 (+3.3%) from the 20,839 counted in the 2000 census.

Montville was incorporated as a township by an act of the New Jersey Legislature on April 11, 1867, from portions of Pequannock Township. It includes the sections of Montville, Pine Brook and Towaco. NJ Transit rail service is available at the Towaco station along the Montclair-Boonton Line.

In Money magazine's 2013 Best Places to Live rankings, Montville was ranked 13th in the nation, the second-highest among the three places in New Jersey included in the top 50 list. The township was ranked 17th in the magazine's 2011 ranking of the "Best Places to Live", the highest-ranked place in New Jersey, after having been ranked 13th in 2007. In 2009, Money magazine named Montville the 21st best place to live in the United States; the 2nd highest ranked community in New Jersey.

History

Native settlement 

Over 10,000 years ago, the area was part of the Lenapehoking. It was originally settled by the Lenape tribes of the Munsee dialect. The Lenape tribes maintained peace and no significant battles were recorded in the area.

On October 12, the Morris County Parks Commission holds Lenape Day at the Great Swamp to celebrate the culture and history of Ramapough Lenape people.

Dutch settlement 
Dutch farmers from New Amsterdam (now part of New York City) entered the area in 1710. As part of New Netherland, the town was originally called "Uyle-Kill" (the Dutch spelling of "Owl-Kill"), a name given to the creek and valley, which ran through the area.

By the 1740s, the settlement had grown in size and construction of the first road was begun. The early road, now known as U.S. Route 202, connected various farms with Montville's first gristmill, sawmill and tanneries.

In 1756, the Dutch Reformed Church was founded in Old Boonton and moved to Montville in the early 1800s after land was purchased in Montville for a parsonage.

English settlement 
In 1712, William Penn bought a tract of land that included parts of modern-day Pequannock and Montville that included Pine Brook.

In 1760, the first schoolhouse in the Montville township was built out of logs in Pine Brook. It was located on "the road leading to Boonton," which could refer to multiple northwest-facing roads including Changebridge Road. Additional schools were constructed in 1785, 1816, and 1852.

During the American Revolutionary War (1775–1783), Montville was on a major military route from Morristown to the Hudson River. General George Washington's troops often took this route and Washington stayed in the Towaco section of what is now Montville Township in June 1780. The French troops under the leadership of General Rochambeau spent four days passing through Montville Township on their way to the War's final victory at Yorktown, Virginia, as part of a group of 5,000 soldiers, 2,000 horses, 500 oxen, possibly 900 cattle, artillery, boats and followers.

The Mandeville Inn was established around 1770 and was pronounced "Mondeveil" by the Dutch, which in turn was corrupted to Montville. The Montville Inn was, up until July 2006, located at the site of the pre-Revolutionary War Mandeville Inn, which burned down in the early 20th century. Other sources attribute the township's name to its location in the mountains of Northern New Jersey.

In 1809, the first store in Montville was opened by Conrad Esler. In 1820, Montville contained 16 houses, 2 bark mills, a grist mill, a cider mill and distillery, a blacksmith shop, a carpenter shop, a wheelwright shop, and a small store; at the time, Montville was considered a business center compared to nearby towns. By 1880, it contained 40 houses, a bark mill, two grist mills, a tannery, a saw mill, a rubber factory, two blacksmith shops, two taverns, and 2 stores.

The construction of the Morris Canal in this area was completed in 1828, bringing commercial navigation to the Montville/Towaco area. The mid-19th century saw the development of two smaller village centers set apart from Montville: Pine Brook, a fertile agricultural area in the Township's southern end, and Towaco, situated on the Morris Canal.

In 1867, Montville and Boonton split off from Pequannock township.

20th century 
By 1910, the population of Montville was 690.

The Pine Brook Speedway, which operated from July 1962 until October 1989, was designed for midget car racing and became one of the earliest sites for microstock racing. Mario Andretti raced at the track and had some of his earliest success as a race car driver at the Speedway.

Geography
According to the United States Census Bureau, the township had a total area of 19.12 square miles (49.51 km2), including 18.63 square miles (48.24 km2) of land and 0.49 square miles (1.27 km2) of water (2.57%).

Unincorporated communities, localities and place names located partially or completely within the township include Horse Neck Bridge, Lake Valhalla, Lower Montville, Pine Brook, Taylortown, Towaco and White Hall.

The township borders the municipalities of Boonton, Boonton Township, East Hanover Township, Kinnelon, Lincoln Park and Parsippany-Troy Hills in Morris County; and Fairfield Township in Essex County.

Camp Dawson is a small camp area in Towaco that is home to a variety of recreational events such as hiking, sledding, soccer, lacrosse, rugby and football. In 2007, Camp Dawson was described by Money magazine as one of reasons for ranking Montville as the 13th best smaller population place to live in the United States. Many Montville sports teams use the fields at Camp Dawson, which include two turf fields mainly used for football, soccer and lacrosse. These fields have lighting available for these teams to play at night. There was a flurry of concern in 2008, when testing of Dawson's new artificial turf playing fields showed what turned out to be false positive finding of dangerously high levels of toxic lead.

Climate
The lowest recorded temperature in Montville is −25 °F (−32 °C), set in February 1943, and the highest recorded temperature is 105 °F (41 °C), set in July 1936 and 2011.

Demographics

2010 census

The Census Bureau's 2006–2010 American Community Survey showed that (in 2010 inflation-adjusted dollars) median household income was $119,493 (with a margin of error of +/− $12,959) and the median family income was $143,811 (+/− $17,082). Males had a median income of $102,178 (+/− $5,041) versus $66,933 (+/− $6,419) for females. The per capita income for the borough was $54,618 (+/− $3,849). About 2.6% of families and 3.1% of the population were below the poverty line, including 1.9% of those under age 18 and 4.4% of those age 65 or over.

Montville has had a growing influx of Asian-Americans. In 2010, 7.1% of Montville's residents self-identified as Indian-American, while 6.4% identified as Chinese-American and 2.7% of residents were Korean-American.

2000 census
As of the 2000 United States census there were 20,839 people, 7,380 households, and 5,867 families residing in the township.  The population density was 1,104.3 people per square mile (426.4/km2).  There were 7,541 housing units at an average density of 399.6 per square mile (154.3/km2).  The racial makeup of the township was 84.95% White, 0.93% African American, 0.04% Native American, 12.57% Asian, 0.02% Pacific Islander, 0.36% from other races, and 1.14% from two or more races. Hispanic or Latino of any race were 2.55% of the population.

There were 7,380 households, out of which 37.4% had children under the age of 18 living with them, 71.0% were married couples living together, 6.4% had a female householder with no husband present, and 20.5% were non-families. 16.6% of all households were made up of individuals, and 5.7% had someone living alone who was 65 years of age or older. The average household size was 2.80 and the average family size was 3.17.

In the township the population was spread out, with 25.2% under the age of 18, 5.5% from 18 to 24, 30.6% from 25 to 44, 28.0% from 45 to 64, and 10.8% who were 65 years of age or older. The median age was 39 years. For every 100 females, there were 94.7 males.  For every 100 females age 18 and over, there were 91.9 males.

The median income for a household in the township was $94,557, and the median income for a family was $105,394. Males had a median income of $71,356 versus $45,427 for females. The per capita income for the township was $43,341.  About 2.6% of families and 3.8% of the population were below the poverty line, including 4.4% of those under age 18 and 6.3% of those age 65 or over.

Government

Local government
Montville is governed under a Special Charter, which was granted by an act of the New Jersey Legislature in 1867 and retains many characteristics of the Township form of government; it is one of 12 municipalities (of the 564) statewide governed by a special charter. The Township Committee is comprised of five members, who are elected directly by the voters at-large in partisan elections to serve three-year terms of office on a staggered basis, with either one or two seats coming up for election each year as part of the November general election in a three-year cycle. At an annual reorganization meeting, the Township Committee selects one of its members to serve as Mayor. The Township Administrator serves as the chief administrative and executive officer for the organization and is responsible for the day-to-day operations of all municipal departments.

, Montville's Township Committee is comprised of Mayor Frank W. Cooney (R, term on committee ends December 31, 2024; term as mayor ends 2022), Deputy mayor Richard A. Cook (R, term on committee and as deputy mayor ends 2022), Richard D. Conklin (R, 2022), Matthew S. Kayne (R, 2023) and June Witty (R, 2023).

A Charter Study Commission was approved by the voters on November 8, 2005, to investigate possible changes to Montville's form of government. The commission voted 4–1 against making any modifications.

The Montville Municipal Court is the judicial branch of government. The Court has original jurisdiction over Motor vehicle violations local ordinance offenses, petty disorderly person offenses, disorderly person offenses, fish and game violations, traffic and criminal offenses, weights and measure violations, and citizen complaints.

Federal, state and county representation
Montville is located in the 11th Congressional District and is part of New Jersey's 26th state legislative district.

 

Morris County is governed by a Board of County Commissioners comprised of seven members who are elected at-large in partisan elections to three-year terms on a staggered basis, with either one or three seats up for election each year as part of the November general election. Actual day-to-day operation of departments is supervised by County Administrator, John Bonanni. , Morris County's Commissioners are
Commissioner Director Tayfun Selen (R, Chatham Township, term as commissioner ends December 31, 2023; term as director ends 2022),
Commissioner Deputy Director John Krickus (R, Washington Township, term as commissioner ends 2024; term as deputy director ends 2022),
Douglas Cabana (R, Boonton Township, 2022), 
Kathryn A. DeFillippo (R, Roxbury, 2022),
Thomas J. Mastrangelo (R, Montville, 2022),
Stephen H. Shaw (R, Mountain Lakes, 2024) and
Deborah Smith (R, Denville, 2024).
The county's constitutional officers are the County Clerk and County Surrogate (both elected for five-year terms of office) and the County Sheriff (elected for a three-year term). , they are 
County Clerk Ann F. Grossi (R, Parsippany–Troy Hills, 2023),
Sheriff James M. Gannon (R, Boonton Township, 2022) and
Surrogate Heather Darling (R, Roxbury, 2024).

Politics
As of June 2021, there were a total of 17,735 registered voters in Montville Township, of which 4,446 (25%) were registered as Democrats, 6,490 (36.5%) were registered as Republicans, with the majority of the remaining 6,799 (38.3%) registered as Unaffiliated.

In the 2020 presidential election, Republican Donald Trump received 50.86% of the vote (7,199 cast), ahead of Democrat Joe Biden with 47.63% (6,742 votes), and other candidates with 1.5% (213 votes). In the 2016 presidential election, Republican Donald Trump received 55.1% of the vote (6,440 cast), ahead of Democrat Hillary Clinton with 42.5% (4,939 votes), and other candidates with 2.7% (311 votes), among the 11,690 ballots cast. In the 2012 presidential election, Republican Mitt Romney received 60.4% of the vote (6,460 cast), ahead of Democrat Barack Obama with 38.3% (4,101 votes), and other candidates with 1.3% (142 votes), among the 10,749 ballots cast by the township's 15,001 registered voters (46 ballots were spoiled), for a turnout of 71.7%. In the 2008 presidential election, Republican John McCain received 57.8% of the vote (6,720 cast), ahead of Democrat Barack Obama with 41.0% (4,761 votes) and other candidates with 0.7% (84 votes), among the 11,623 ballots cast by the township's 14,890 registered voters, for a turnout of 78.1%. In the 2004 presidential election, Republican George W. Bush received 59.0% of the vote (6,605 ballots cast), outpolling Democrat John Kerry with 40.0% (4,483 votes) and other candidates with 0.5% (77 votes), among the 11,203 ballots cast by the township's 14,582 registered voters, for a turnout percentage of 76.8.

In the 2013 gubernatorial election, Republican Chris Christie received 74.7% of the vote (4,703 cast), ahead of Democrat Barbara Buono with 24.1% (1,515 votes), and other candidates with 1.2% (74 votes), among the 6,389 ballots cast by the township's 14,958 registered voters (97 ballots were spoiled), for a turnout of 42.7%. In the 2009 gubernatorial election, Republican Chris Christie received 61.6% of the vote (4,679 ballots cast), ahead of Democrat Jon Corzine with 30.0% (2,278 votes), Independent Chris Daggett with 6.8% (513 votes) and other candidates with 0.9% (69 votes), among the 7,593 ballots cast by the township's 14,526 registered voters, yielding a 52.3% turnout.

In the 2014 senate election, Republican Jeff Bell received 60.6% of the vote (3,191 cast), ahead of Democrat Cory Booker with 38.3% of the vote (2,017 votes), and other candidates with 1.1% (57 votes), among the 5,265 ballots cast.

Education

The Montville Township School District serves public school students in pre-kindergarten through twelfth grade. As of the 2020–21 school year, the district, comprised of seven schools, had an enrollment of 3,439 students and 359.1 classroom teachers (on an FTE basis), for a student–teacher ratio of 9.6:1. Schools in the district (with 2020–21 enrollment data from the National Center for Education Statistics) are 
Cedar Hill Elementary School with 295 students in grades PreK-5, 
Hilldale Elementary School with 297 students in grades K-5, 
William H. Mason Jr. Elementary School with 239 students in grades K-5, 
Valley View Elementary School with 339 students in grades PreK-5, 
Woodmont Elementary School with 307 students in grades K-5, 
Robert R. Lazar Middle School with 839 students in grades 6-8 and 
Montville Township High School with 1,079 students in grades 9–12. Montville Extended Day Learning Center is an after-school program available at all the elementary schools in the district. In 2016, Cedar Hill Elementary School and Woodmont Elementary School were two of ten schools in New Jersey recognized as a National Blue Ribbon School by the United States Department of Education.

Private schools include Trinity Christian School, a Christian day school founded in 1986 that serves students in Kindergarten through 12th grade. St. Pius X School was a K–8 Catholic school that operated under the auspices of the Roman Catholic Diocese of Paterson until it closed after the 2017–2018 school year after enrollment numbers for the 2018–2019 school year were just more than half of the 250 students needed to remain financially viable.

Community
Montville Day is celebrated every year in the fall. It brings members of the community together to enjoy food and entertainment.

Transportation

Roads and highways

Major routes that pass through include Interstate 287 and U.S. Route 202 in the north, and both Interstate 80 and U.S. Route 46 in the south. Both interstates house interchanges in the township.

Public transportation
As part of its Midtown Direct expansion program, NJ Transit, with supplemental funding from the Township of Montville, renovated the Towaco train station using a design hearkening back to the early 1900s. Service is provided on the Montclair-Boonton Line from Towaco to Penn Station in Midtown Manhattan via a transfer in Montclair through Newark to Manhattan.

NJ Transit offers bus service to and from Newark on the 29 route, with local service available on the 871 and 874 routes, replacing service that had been offered on the MCM1 route until 2010, when subsidies to the local provider were eliminated as part of budget cuts.

Lakeland Bus Lines offers service along Route 46 between Dover and the Port Authority Bus Terminal in Midtown Manhattan and along Route 80 between Newton and New York City.

Notable people

People who were born in, residents of, or otherwise closely associated with Montville include:

 Omar Amanat (born ), entrepreneur, investor and chairman of the Aman Resorts Group
 Lester Archambeau (born 1967), former professional football player
 Stacey Bradford, financial journalist, author and commentator; author of The Wall Street Journal Financial Guidebook for New Parents
 Chris Brauchle (born 1967), retired professional soccer player
 Hector A. Cafferata Jr. (born 1929), United States Marine awarded the Medal of Honor for his heroic service at the Battle of Chosin Reservoir during the Korean War
 John H. Capstick (1856–1918), represented 5th congressional district from 1918 to 1919
 Albert Stanburrough Cook (1853–1927), professor of English
 Bruce Driver (born 1962), former professional hockey player for the New Jersey Devils and New York Rangers
 Dilly Duka (born 1989), soccer player who currently plays for Columbus Crew in Major League Soccer
 Ulric Ellerhusen (1879–1957), sculptor best known for his works of architectural sculpture
 Lauren English (born 1989), swimmer who set the United States Open Record in the 50m backstroke
 Ashley Lauren Fisher (born 1975), actress, model and spinal cord injury activist
 Ron Galella (born 1931), photographer called "the Godfather of the U.S. paparazzi culture", known for his photos of (and battles with) Jacqueline Kennedy Onassis and Marlon Brando
 Teresa Giudice (born 1972), featured on The Real Housewives of New Jersey
 Hank Lyon (born 1988), member of the Morris County Board of chosen freeholders, who became the state's youngest freeholder when he took office in 2012
 Kristen McNabb (born 1994), soccer defender who plays for Seattle Reign FC of the National Women's Soccer League
 Carol Murphy (born 1932), member of the New Jersey General Assembly from 1992 to 2000
 Dan O'Dowd (born 1959), former general manager of the Colorado Rockies
 Joseph Pennacchio (born 1955), member of the New Jersey Senate
 Jim Price (born 1966), former professional football player with the Dallas Cowboys
 Alan Sepinwall (born 1973), television reviewer
 Olivia Blois Sharpe, cast member of reality show Jerseylicious
 Dena Tauriello, drummer for the rock band Antigone Rising
 Buddy Valastro (born 1977), celebrity chef, entrepreneur, and reality television personality who is the owner of Carlo's Bakery and star of the TV series Cake Boss
 Walter D. Van Riper (1895–1973), Attorney General of New Jersey from 1944 to 1948
 James P. Vreeland (1910–2001), former mayor of Montville who served for 10 years in the New Jersey Senate
 Travis Warech (born 1991), professional basketball player for Israeli team Hapoel Be'er Sheva
 John Wurts (1792–1861), member of the United States House of Representatives from Pennsylvania
 Pete Yorn (born 1974), singer-songwriter

References

External links

Montville Chamber of Commerce
Montville Township School District

 
1867 establishments in New Jersey
Populated places established in 1867
Special Charters in New Jersey
Townships in Morris County, New Jersey